Alex Lilly is an American singer-songwriter. She has played in the touring bands for Beck, Lorde, Ry Cooder, and The Bird and the Bee. Since 2010 she has played in The Living Sisters, a supergroup featuring The Bird and the Bee's Inara George, Lavender Diamond's Becky Stark, and solo performer Eleni Mandell.

In 2019 Lilly released her solo debut album 2% Milk on Inara George's label Release Me Records. The album was produced by Jacob Bercovici of The Voidz and Andy Bauer of Twin Shadow. On July 31, 2020, she released a song bundle on Release Me called Love in Three Colors. She has also announced an EP with Barbara Gruska of The Belle Brigade and an upcoming stage musical.

Discography

As Obi Best
 2008: Capades
 2011: Sentimental Education

As Alex Lilly
 2016: Paranoid Times - EP
 2019: 2% Milk
 2020: Love in Three Colors - EP
 2022: Repetition is a Sin

With The Living Sisters
 2010: Love To Live
 2013: Run for Cover
 2014: Harmony is Real: Songs for a Happy Holiday

References

American singer-songwriters
American indie pop musicians
Living people
Year of birth missing (living people)
The Living Sisters members